Georges Édouard Nicolo better known by the stage name Georgio (born in Lilas, Seine-Saint-Denis, France on 21 January 1993) is a French rapper and singer of Guadeloupean descent and originating from 18e arrondissement of Paris. He has released four studio albums, Bleu noir (2015), Héra (2016), XX5 (2018) and Sacré (2021)  and most recently Années Sauvages (2022). He also released 5 EPs and a number of singles.

Beginnings
Of Guadeloupean descent, Georgio came from a broken home with divorced parents. He has a brother, Anatole, who is passionate about football. In his middle school years , he lived in Angers, before moving to the 18e arrondissement. He developped an interest in music and basketball from a very young age. Georgio left school early  for a street life which made him have a number of run-ins with the law and concentrating on his rap, his passion, working small jobs to make some living. By 14, he was writing his first rap pieces. Having many rapper friends, he started with the group 93 millimètres. At 16 he lived for a while with his grandmother in La Celle Saint Cloud in the commune of Yvelines. In a difficult period, he discovered love of reading and music was a common trait with his grandmother and that inspired the song "La Celle Saint Cloud" in his album Bleu Noir.

Career
His first project was a net tape Une Nuit Blanche, des Idées Noires which was a collection of various pieces from 2009 à 2011. His first real project was in 2012 titled Mon Prisme available for free download with 11 songs including two instrumental pieces and a remix. Invitees included 2zer Washington of S-Crew and L'Entourage, also Acide Verbal and Jane. His first EP Soleil d'Hiver was released on 6 May 2013. that included 9 songs produced by the beatmaker Hologram Lo' from 1995. Collaborations included Vald, Lomepal, Alpha Wann, Koma and C-Sen. He followed that up with a freely available mixtape Nouveau Souffle On 19 May 2014, he released the EP À l'Abri, with 8 titles and a bonus title.

A break came with being in the rap collective 75ème Session with names like rappers Népal, Sanka, Sheldon, Limsa, Sopico, Hash24, in addition to graphic artists video makers and benefitted from recording possibilities in a recording studio. In October 2014, he said he was parting way with 75ème Session. He continued working with his childhood friend Sanka/ He also collaborated with beatmakers Diabi and A Little Rooster.

In his lyrics and in interviews, Georgio said he was inspired by his family, friends and surroundings and areas around Métro Marx Dormoy in the 18th arrondissement. In his debut album Bleu Noir, he talked about his suffering from depression. later he was effected by his first love Salomé, a recurring theme in his songs, and later in his second album titled Héra, an ode for love and referring to the goddess of marriage. Georgio was also very much into reading sharing literary passages with friends and through social media including references in his song lyrics, also citing his preferred poet Robert Desnos, in his concert of rap and literature titled Proses during the 19ème Printemps des Poètes, also citing Céline, Vladimir Maïakovski, Henri Michaux, Marc Aurèle, Romain Gary. In a cultural event organized by the radio station France Culture, Georgio used a text by Frida Kahlo, in a music version.

Discography

Albums

EPs

Singles

Featured in

Appearances and collaborations
2011: "Elyxir" - Vald feat. Georgio
2012: "La Ive" - Vald feat. Georgio
2012: "Épices Loufoques" - Vald feat. Georgio
2012: "Good Time" - Mothas la Mascarade feat. Tonio Mc, Lomepal & Georgio
2012: "Freestyle Séquestration" - Vald feat. Georgio 
2012: "Anonymous" - 2 zer Washington feat. Georgio 
2013: "1er Round - Limsa feat. Georgio & Salim
2013: "Trop d'Amérique" - Sanka feat. Georgio
2014: "Missak - Demi Portion, Lucio Bukowski, Liqid, Ethor Skull, Nekfeu, Dico, Doc Brown, Georgio & Vald 
2014: "On oublie pas" - Aladin 135 feat. Georgio
2014: "Voyous" - Fauve feat. Georgio
2014: "Freestyle Daymolition" - Vald feat. Georgio
2020: "Besoin de personne" - Tsew The Kid feat. Georgio
2020: "Pas comme nous" - Matou feat. Jok'air & Georgio

References

1993 births
Living people